Nadie te querrá como yo ("No One Will Love You Like Me") is a 1972 Mexican film.

It stars Hilda Aguirre as Isabel Carrasco, Andrés García as Javier, Gloria Marín as Señora Carrasco, Isabel's mother, and Sara García as her grandmother.

External links
 

1972 films
Mexican thriller drama films
1970s Spanish-language films
1970s Mexican films